The 1961 Army Cadets football team represented the United States Military Academy in the 1961 NCAA University Division football season. In their third year under head coach Dale Hall, the Cadets compiled a 6–4 record and outscored all opponents by a combined total of 224 to 118.  In the annual Army–Navy Game, the Cadets lost to the Midshipmen by a 13 to 7 score. The Cadets also lost to Michigan, West Virginia, and Oklahoma. 
 
No Army players were selected on the 1961 College Football All-America Team.

Schedule

References

Army
Army Black Knights football seasons
Army Cadets football